It's the Bootleg, Muthafuckas! are a series of compilation albums released by Apathy.

It's the Bootleg, Muthafuckas! Volume 1 

It's the Bootleg, Muthafuckas! Volume 1 was released in 2003.

CD 1

CD 2

Hell's Lost and Found: It's the Bootleg, Muthafuckas! Volume 2 

Hell's Lost and Found: It's the Bootleg, Muthafuckas! Volume 2 was released on November 27, 2007. It had a 2 disc special both contained 19 tracks each. The track Drive it Like I Stole It was also featured on the Midnight Club 3: DUB edition Soundtrack. The track "Bloc Party" is also featured on the Fort Minor: We Major mixtape by Fort Minor, the side-project of Mike Shinoda from Linkin Park, released on October 30, 2005, and as a Limited Edition in 2006.

CD 1

CD 2

Fire Walk with Me: It's the Bootleg, Muthafuckas! Volume 3 

It's the Bootleg, Muthafuckas! Volume 3: Fire Walk with Me was released on September 11, 2012, It was released along with The Alien Tongue.

CD 1

CD 2

The Black Lodge: It's the Bootleg, Muthafuckas! Volume 4

It's the Bootleg, Muthafuckas! Volume 4: The Black Lodge was released on June 30, 2015 along with Apathy's new EP, Weekend at the Cape.

CD 1

References

2003 compilation albums
2007 compilation albums
2012 compilation albums
Apathy (rapper) albums
Babygrande Records compilation albums
Demigodz Records albums
Hip hop compilation albums
Compilation album series
Sequel albums